"Immigrant Song" is a song by the English rock band Led Zeppelin. It is built upon a repeating riff and features lyrical references to Norse mythology, with singer Robert Plant's howling vocals mentioning war-making and Valhalla. The song was included on their 1970 album, Led Zeppelin III and released as a single. Several live recordings have also been issued on various Led Zeppelin albums. Other artists have recorded renditions of the song or performed it live.

Though Led Zeppelin are typically regarded as an album-oriented group, "Immigrant Song" is one of the band's several hit singles. The song's popularity has led to its inclusion in such compilation albums as Led Zeppelin Remasters (1990) and Early Days: The Best of Led Zeppelin, Vol. 1 (1999).

Background
"Immigrant Song" was written during Led Zeppelin's tour of Iceland, Bath and Germany in the summer of 1970. The opening date of this tour took place in Reykjavík, Iceland, which inspired Plant to write the lyrics. He explained in an interview:

Six days after Led Zeppelin's appearance in Reykjavik, the band performed the song for the first time in concert during the Bath Festival.

Composition and lyrics
The song begins with a distinctive, wailing cry from Plant and is built on a repeating, staccato riff by guitarist Jimmy Page, bassist John Paul Jones, and drummer John Bonham. It is performed in the key of F minor at a moderate tempo of 112 beats per minute. There is a very faint count-off at the beginning of the track with much hiss which appears on the album version, but is trimmed from the single version. The hiss is feedback from an echo unit.

A phrase from the song was used as the title of Stephen Davis' biography of the band, Hammer of the Gods: The Led Zeppelin Saga. The lyrics also did much to inspire the classic heavy metal myth, of Viking-esque figures on an adventure, themes which have been adopted in the look and lyrics of bands such as Iron Maiden, Saxon, Manowar and Amon Amarth.

Releases
"Immigrant Song" is one of Led Zeppelin's few releases on the 45 rpm single format. It was issued in the United States on 5 November 1970 by Atlantic Records and reached number 16 on the Billboard Hot 100. First pressings of the US single have a quote from Aleister Crowley inscribed in dead wax by the run-out groove: "Do what thou wilt shall be the whole of the Law." The Japanese single included "Out on the Tiles" as the B-side.

Reception
In a contemporary review of Led Zeppelin III, Lester Bangs of Rolling Stone described "Immigrant Song" as the closest to being as classic as "Whole Lotta Love", praising the song's "bulldozer rhythms and Plant's double-tracked wordless vocal crossings echoing behind the main vocal like some cannibal chorus wailing in the infernal light of a savage fertility rite."

Cash Box described the song as "filling the aural spectrum once again with wall to wall power," stating that the song has "biting vocals and an unmatched instrumental impact."

Live performances

"Immigrant Song" was used to open Led Zeppelin concerts from 1970 to 1972. On the second half of their 1972 concert tour of the United States, it was introduced by a short piece of music known as "LA Drone", designed to heighten the sense of anticipation and expectation amongst the concert audience. By 1973, "Immigrant Song" was occasionally being used as an encore, but was then removed from their live set. Live versions of the song can be heard on the Led Zeppelin albums How the West Was Won (featuring a performance at Long Beach Arena in 1972) and the Led Zeppelin BBC Sessions (a version from the Paris Theatre in London in 1971). When the song was played live, Page included a lengthy guitar solo, which was absent on the recorded Led Zeppelin III version. "Immigrant Song" was played as part of the 2009 Rock and Roll Hall of Fame induction ceremony for Jeff Beck by both Page and Beck.

Use of the song in media
Led Zeppelin originally denied Richard Linklater permission to use "Immigrant Song" in School of Rock, but star Jack Black was able to convince them by making a video of himself performing the song. A cover of "Immigrant Song", produced by Atticus Ross and Nine Inch Nails member Trent Reznor with vocals from Yeah Yeah Yeahs lead singer Karen O, plays in the trailer and throughout the title sequence of The Girl with the Dragon Tattoo. "Immigrant Song" was included in both the trailer for Thor: Ragnarok and twice in the film itself, due to director Taika Waititi's suggestion of the song from the time of his first involvement with the film and to the persistent efforts of the movie's music supervisor Dave Jordan.

Chart history

Original release
Weekly charts

Year-end charts

Digital download

Note: The official UK Singles Chart incorporated legal downloads as of 17 April 2005.

Certifications

See also
List of cover versions of Led Zeppelin songs"Immigrant Song" entries

References

External links
"Immigrant Song" at ledzeppelin.com
 

1970 singles
1970 songs
Atlantic Records singles
Led Zeppelin songs
Song recordings produced by Jimmy Page
Songs written by Jimmy Page
Songs written by Robert Plant
Norse mythology in music
Viking metal songs